Teijo National Park is a national park in Southwest Finland, Finland in the Perniö area of Salo municipality. It is maintained by Metsähallitus.

In the National Park, there is one eutrophic fen, which is a type of mire that has almost disappeared in southern Finland. The forests are mainly young managed pine forests. The park is also home for several species of freshwater fish, nesting birds including goose, cranes, sandpipers and grouse; and mammals such as moose and deer.

Included in the national park are historical industrial areas, including a former iron works area in Kirjakkala. The iron works contain many log houses from the 1800s which have been renovated to their original state.

See also 
 List of national parks of Finland
 Protected areas of Finland

References

External links
 Teijo National Park

National parks of Finland
Protected areas established in 2015
Geography of Southwest Finland
Tourist attractions in Southwest Finland
2015 establishments in Finland